Panglao, officially the Municipality of Panglao,  is a 4th class municipality in the province of Bohol, Philippines. According to the 2020 census, it has a population of 39,839 people.

It is one of two municipalities that make up Panglao Island (the other being Dauis). Panglao is known for its diving locations and tourist resorts.

The name Panglao may have come from its former name Panglawod, meaning "to the open sea", or derived from the word panggaw, referring to a fishing implement used by locals.

Panglao has educational institutions, including the San Agustin Academy (Panglao), Lourdes National High School, the Cristal  and elementary schools located in every barangay (including the Panglao Central Elementary School). It is also home to Panglao Island International Airport that serves as Bohol's primary airport replacing Tagbilaran Airport. It opened in November 2018.

The town of Panglao, Bohol celebrates its fiesta on August 27–28, to honor the town patron San Agustin.

History

Well before the Spanish colonization, the area was already long visited by Chinese and other Asian traders, as evinced by archaeological finds of Tang, Song, and Ming dynasty porcelain and trade wares.

Panglao flourished during the rule of the Dapitan kingdom, but raids by Moluccans and conquest by Ternate resulted in periods of depopulation when its population fled mostly to Panay and Mindanao, including Dapitan.

During the Spanish rule, a Jesuit mission post was established, that in 1782 was formed into a parish, known as La Iglesia de San Agustin de Panglawod. In 1803, the town was officially made into a municipality.

The Panglao watchtower was built in 1851. The 5-storey octagonal tower is the tallest of its kind in the Philippines but suffers from neglect.

Geography

The municipality occupies the southwestern part of the eponymous Panglao Island, and its territory also includes the three smaller islands of Balicasag, Gakang, and Pontod (or Pungtud, also known as Virgin Island).

There are no fresh water streams or lakes on the island, so for its drinking water, the municipality is dependent on wells and the Canhilbas Underground Spring.

Climate

Barangays

Panglao comprises 10 barangays:

Demographics

Economy

Tourism

The primary tourist attraction of Panglao are its white sandy beaches, of which Alona Beach is the most famous and most developed. However it has drawn criticism for its unrestrained development that ignored municipal development policies, warning against overcrowding and Alona to lose its paradise-like image. Therefore, the municipal, provincial and national governments are ploughing ahead with a plan to build a new international airport on Panglao island, with the final approach path directly over Alona beach. Bohol–Panglao International Airport, also known as New Bohol International Airport, is an international airport on Panglao Island in the province of Bohol, Philippines. It replaced Tagbilaran Airport which was small. Bohol–Panglao International Airport, has been operational since 28-Nov-2018.

Other beaches include Bagobo, Bolod, Danao, Doljo, and Momo Beaches there are many more hidden beaches. Some are controlled by various resorts also.

Panglao is renowned for snorkeling and dive sites such as Doljo Beach, Garden Eels, Arco Point, Kalipayan, Napaling, and Puntod. Tours can readily be arranged to further dive sites, including Balicasag and Pamilacan, Bohol islands.

Gallery

Notable personalities

 Rebecca Lusterio – Actress, born in Balicasag island

References

External links

 [ Philippine Standard Geographic Code]
Municipality of Panglao
Panglao
Alona Beach Guide

Municipalities of Bohol
Underwater diving sites in the Philippines